George Murdoch (born February 21, 1973) is an American professional wrestler, cable news personality, and actor known by his ring/stage name Tyrus. As a wrestler, he is signed to the National Wrestling Alliance (NWA), where he is the reigning NWA Worlds Heavyweight Champion in his first reign. As a cable news personality, he appears on Fox News, and its sister streaming service Fox Nation, primarily as a co-host/panelist on the late-night talk show Gutfeld!, as well as a contributor/fill-in host on other programs.

After training in WWE's developmental territories, such as Deep South Wrestling (DSW) and Florida Championship Wrestling (FCW), Murdoch under the ring name Brodus Clay debuted during the fourth season of NXT, a WWE television show where rookies were paired with established WWE wrestlers as mentors. He debuted on the main roster as Alberto Del Rio's bodyguard. During 2012, WWE changed his gimmick to The Funkusaurus, a funk dancer accompanied by his backup dancers the Funkydactyls. He wrestled in WWE until his departure in 2014.  From 2014 to 2017, Murdoch wrestled in Total Nonstop Action Wrestling (TNA, now Impact Wrestling) under the ring name of Tyrus. In 2021, he joined the NWA, where he won the NWA World Television Championship, and later the promotion's primary title — the Worlds Heavyweight Championship.

Tyrus published his autobiography Just Tyrus: A Memoir in 2022, which has become a New York Times bestseller.

Early life
Murdoch is biracial; his father is black and his mother is white. He has stated that when he was born, his father was 19 years old and his mother was 15. In 2018, Murdoch disclosed a childhood incident in which his abusive father damaged his eye by hitting him; this incident led his mother to leave his father. While Murdoch's mother moved back to her parents' home, Murdoch has stated that he and his brother were not welcome there because they were part black. According to Murdoch, he and his brother lived with a foster family for many years; during this time, Murdoch was "obsessed" with changing his skin color, thinking that this would allow him to be reunited with his family. Murdoch and his brother eventually lived with their mother again, but Murdoch left home at age 15.

In 1990, Murdoch attended Quartz Hill High School in Los Angeles County, California, and then in 1992, Antelope Valley College. By 1995, he was attending the University of Nebraska at Kearney, where he studied to become a teacher. He played college football during his school days. However, Murdoch has stated that his football career ended when surgery to remove a ruptured appendix severed nerves ending in his leg, leaving him with a permanent limp.

Murdoch has worked as a bodyguard for Snoop Dogg.

Professional wrestling career

World Wrestling Entertainment / WWE

Developmental territories (2006–2008)
After signing a contract with World Wrestling Entertainment (WWE), Murdoch was assigned to Deep South Wrestling (DSW), a WWE developmental territory. He debuted in September 2006 and began using the ring name G-Rilla along with adopting the gimmick of a street thug. In his first match for the promotion, he defeated Big Bully Douglas in a dark match on September 7. The following month, G-Rilla became the enforcer for Urban Assault, a tag team composed of Eric Pérez and Sonny Siaki. However, he got in a feud with The Bag Lady, which cost Urban Assault a match for the DSW Tag Team Championship against The Major Brothers (Brian and Brett) on October 26. The group eventually won the championships from them on November 30, but the situation repeated on December 21, when G-Rilla started fighting with Bag Lady's ally Freakin' Deacon at ringside and it caused Urban Assault to lose to the Major Brothers. The same night, Deacon defeated G-Rilla in a singles match, after which Perez, Siaki, and new member Afa Jr. attacked G-Rilla, throwing him out of the group.

In early January 2007, G-Rilla feuded with Urban Assault, attacking the members during matches. He then formed a tag team with former enemy Freakin' Deacon, with the pair defeating Urban Assault in their first match together. They went on to defeat teams including Frankie Coverdale and Bob Hoskins, the Samoan Fight Club of Siaki and Afa Jr., Shawn Osborne and Jon Bolen, and Robert Anthony and Johnny Curtis. In March, they faced and defeated the DSW Tag Team Champions, Team Elite (Mike Knox and Derrick Neikirk) in two successive non-title matches. However, in March 2007 Deacon was beaten up with steel chairs by Neikirk and Knox, the events of the night sent Deacon into a mental breakdown. The team dissolved shortly after.

In June 2007, Murdoch made his debut at FCW's inaugural show on June 26, using the name G-Rilla and defeating Shawn Osborne. Three months later, on September 15, G-Rilla won a battle royal to become the number one contender to the FCW Southern Heavyweight Championship by last eliminating Teddy Hart. He challenged Harry Smith for the championship on September 25, but lost via disqualification which meant that Smith retained the championship. The following month, G-Rilla continued to feud with Smith and Hart, who had formed The Hart Dynasty with TJ Wilson and Ted DiBiase, Jr., allying himself with Osborne, Jake Hager and Afa, Jr. G-Rilla briefly formed a tag team with Robert Anthony in December 2007, but on February 4, 2008, Murdoch was released from his contract with WWE. He would not wrestle for the next two years.

NXT and alliance with Alberto Del Rio (2010–2011)
After a two year hiatus, in January 2010, Murdoch re-signed with WWE and was assigned to FCW. In March, Murdoch, once again using the name G-Rilla, formed an alliance with The Uso Brothers, Tamina, and Donny Marlow. He went on to defeat both Jacob Novak and Rudy Parker, before changing his ring name to Brodus Clay, a play on Snoop Dogg's real name (Calvin Cordozar Broadus), in May 2010. On June 16, Clay and Marlow challenged Los Aviadores (Hunico and Epico) for the FCW Florida Tag Team Championship, but were unsuccessful. That same month, Clay and Marlow began referring to themselves as the Colossal Connection. The Colossal Connection would unsuccessfully challenge Los Aviadores and Derrick Bateman and Johnny Curtis for the FCW Florida Tag Team Championship over the following months. In October, Clay appeared at a WWE house show, where he lost to JTG.

During the finale of season three of NXT, Clay was named part of the fourth season, with Ted DiBiase and Maryse as his Pros. He made his in-ring debut on NXT on the December 14, 2010 episode, teaming with DiBiase to defeat Byron Saxton and his mentor Chris Masters. Clay won a four-way elimination match on the January 25 episode of NXT, earning the right to choose a new Pro. He picked Alberto Del Rio as his new Pro, and then attacked DiBiase. The following week, Clay defeated DiBiase in a singles match; Del Rio "temporarily" passed Pro responsibilities of Clay to his manager Ricardo Rodriguez, but never returned for the rest of the season. In the season finale on March 1, Clay ended the competition in second place, losing to Curtis.

Following his stint in NXT, on the March 7 episode of Raw, Clay debuted as Del Rio's new bodyguard and replaced him in his match against Christian in a losing effort. As Del Rio was feuding with Edge and Christian, Clay faced off with single matches against them and also teamed with Del Rio to face Edge and Christian. Clay accompanied Del Rio to the ring at WrestleMania XXVII for his match with Edge. On the April 25 episode of Raw, Del Rio was drafted to Raw, while Clay remained on SmackDown. Clay's final appearance with Del Rio occurred on May 1 at Extreme Rules, when he interfered on Del Rio's behalf as Del Rio faced Christian in a ladder match for the vacant World Heavyweight Championship. Despite this, Del Rio was unsuccessful in winning the match. After a three-month absence due to the filming of the movie No One Lives, Clay reappeared on the August 4, 2011 episode of Superstars, where he defeated Pat Silva. Over the next few weeks, Clay continued to squash various jobbers on Superstars.

The Funkasaurus (2012–2014)

WWE ran vignettes promoting his return to television on the November 7, 2011 episode of Raw. However, Clay's television return was continuously delayed by authority figure John Laurinaitis to be "next week", with this trend continuing all the way into January 2012. Clay made his television return on the January 9, 2012 episode of Raw as a face (heroic character) with a fun-loving, funk dancing gimmick, with the nickname "The Funkasaurus" and began using Ernest "The Cat" Miller's theme song "Somebody Call My Momma". Now accompanied by The Funkadactyls (Naomi and Cameron) and announced as hailing from "Planet Funk", Clay incorporated gyrations and dance moves into his various squash wins on both Raw and SmackDown.

At WrestleMania XXVIII, Clay made an on-stage appearance, calling and dancing with Momma Clay. The following night on Raw, Clay started a feud with Dolph Ziggler and Jack Swagger when he saved Santino Marella from them. Clay and Marella beat Ziggler and Swagger on the April 9 episode of Raw. On the April 20 episode of SmackDown, Clay began a brief association with Hornswoggle. At Extreme Rules, Clay defeated Ziggler. By May, Clay was on a 21-match winning streak since adopting the Funkasaurus gimmick.

On the May 28 episode of Raw, Big Show justified his recent heel turn by blaming Clay. Hearing this, Clay then challenged Big Show to a match that night. Before the match could start, Big Show attacked Clay at ringside and brutally assaulted him. On the June 8 episode of SmackDown, Clay was banned by General Manager John Laurinaitis from appearing on Raw "to protect him from Big Show" so he was transferred to SmackDown. Big Show's attack also led Clay to vow to be more aggressive in the ring. At No Way Out, Clay defeated David Otunga in the pre-show match. Later during the pay-per-view, Clay interfered in the main event steel cage match, costing Big Show the match to John Cena and as per the match stipulation, causing the firing of John Laurinaitis. Big Show then made an appearance on the June 22 episode of SmackDown, leading to Clay physically confronting him. With Laurinaitis fired, Clay was allowed to return to Raw from June 25, where he faced Big Show; Big Show defeated Clay to end Clay's 24-match winning streak. Clay then began a feud with Damien Sandow on the July 30 episode of Raw; Sandow attacked Clay when he laughed at a video of Sandow's beatdown at the hands of DX. Clay and Sandow finally faced off on the August 20 episode of Raw, where Sandow won, but he was attacked by Clay after the match. At the Survivor Series pay-per-view, Clay took part in 10 man elimination tag team match alongside Tyson Kidd, Justin Gabriel, Rey Mysterio and Sin Cara, but he was the first man out after being eliminated by Tensai.

In January 2013, Clay competed in the 2013 Royal Rumble match and was eliminated by five men. Tensai was embarrassed after a dance contest, but Clay encouraged him to dance and have fun because "what happens in Vegas stays in Vegas". Tensai, with Clay's encouragement, began using several "silly dance moves". Two days later on WWE Main Event, Clay came out to support Tensai during his match with Titus O'Neil. Following this, Clay and Tensai formed a tag team and went on to defeat established teams such as Primo & Epico, Heath Slater and Jinder Mahal of 3MB and Team Rhodes Scholars (Cody Rhodes and Damien Sandow). On the March 22 episode of SmackDown, Tensai and Clay were defeated by Team Rhodes Scholars after an interference from The Bella Twins. Tensai and Clay announced their official tag-team name "Tons of Funk" on the March 27 episode of Main Event, where they accompanied The Funkadactyls to ring in a losing effort to The Bella Twins. The two teams were originally booked to face each other in an eight-person mixed tag team match on April 7 at WrestleMania 29, but their match was cut due to time constraints. The match instead took place the following night on Raw, where Tons of Funk and The Funkadactyls emerged victorious.

In November 2013, Clay started a storyline where he became angry and jealous of the debuting Xavier Woods, who "borrowed" Clay's music and The Funkadactyls for his entrance. Clay thus began to exhibit more villainous tendencies, such as repeatedly attacking Woods, after he had defeated Woods in a match. At TLC: Tables, Ladders & Chairs, Clay faced Woods' partner, R-Truth and continually assaulted Truth instead of going for a win, so Tensai and the Funkadactyls left in protest and Clay lost the match.

On the next day on Raw, Clay completed his heel turn by abandoning Tensai to lose their tag match and attacking Tensai after the match. Clay found no immediate success, as he went on to lose to Tensai, Woods and Truth in singles matches. On the April 17 episode NXT, Clay would lose by countout against Adrian Neville in a non-title match. On June 12, 2014, Clay was released by WWE.

Total Nonstop Action Wrestling / Impact Wrestling (2014–2018)

On September 16, 2014, Murdoch debuted for Total Nonstop Action Wrestling (TNA) under the ring name Tyrus at TNA's television tapings, aligning himself with Ethan Carter III (EC3). Moments after EC3 introduced him, he had his first wrestling match on the October 15 episode of Impact Wrestling against Shark Boy, which he won. Together they entered the TNA World Tag Team Championship number one contenders tournament, defeating Eric Young and Rockstar Spud in the quarterfinals, only to lose to The Hardy Boyz on the October 29 episode of Impact Wrestling in the semifinals, when Tyrus was pinned by Matt Hardy. At Lockdown, Tyrus defeated Spud and Mark Andrews in a 2-on-1 Six Sides of Steel match. On May 15, 2015 episode of Impact Wrestling, Tyrus lost to Mr. Anderson. At Slammiversary, Carter and Tyrus defeated Lashley and Mr. Anderson in the co-main event. On October 4, 2015, at Bound For Glory, Tyrus won a gauntlet for the gold match to become the number one contender for the TNA World Heavyweight Championship.

On a June 28, 2016 taping of Impact Wrestling, Tyrus returned as a "fixer" for hire, siding with Grado and Mahabali Shera in a match against The Tribunal and Al Snow. Since then, TNA began airing vignettes for the "fixer" gimmick on Impact Wrestling on weekly basis. At One Night Only: September 2016, Tyrus defeated Crazzy Steve. This was his first singles victory since Bound for Glory 2015. Tyrus returned to Impact Wrestling and began aligning himself with Eli Drake. On January 6, 2017, Tyrus and Eli Drake unsuccessfully challenged The Broken Hardys (Jeff Hardy and Matt Hardy) for the TNA World Tag Team Championships at TNA One Night Only: Live!. On August 18, 2017, the promotion announced that Tyrus was granted his release from his contract. Murdoch explained that he didn't feel comfortable with Jeff Jarrett returning to Impact, since Murdoch decided in the past to stay with TNA and didn't sign a contract with GFW.

At Impact's January 2018 tapings, he returned to defeat his former boss Ethan Carter III after turning on him. However, his return was short-lived when, on April 18, 2018, Tyrus left Impact once again, confirming his release and departure from the company. Murdoch claimed that poor booking decisions involving his character would hurt his reputation, so he left the promotion again.

Independent circuit (2018) 
Tyrus made his debut for Tommy Dreamer's House of Hardcore at House of Hardcore 52 on December 8, teaming with Robert Strauss to unsuccessfully face David Arquette and RJ City.

National Wrestling Alliance (2021–present)
On March 11, 2021, National Wrestling Alliance announced on their social media that Tyrus would make his NWA debut at Back For The Attack. On the August 6 episode of NWA Powerrr, Tyrus defeated The Pope to win the NWA World Television Championship.

Tyrus unsuccessfully challenged Trevor Murdoch for the NWA Worlds Heavyweight Championship at NWA 74th Anniversary Show on August 28, 2022. On the September 24, 2022 episode of NWA USA, Tyrus vacated the NWA World Television Championship using the "Lucky 7" rule to challenge Murdoch and Matt Cardona for the NWA Worlds Heavyweight Championship at NWA Hard Times 3. At the event on November 12, Tyrus pinned Murdoch to win the title, marking his first world championship in his career. On February 11, 2023, at Nuff Said, Tyrus made his first successful title defense against Cardona, and was confronted by guest commentator Bully Ray afterwards.

Tyrus, holding the NWA Worlds Heavyweight Championship belt, was featured in a commercial for Fox News Channel's talk show 'Gutfeld!' during Super Bowl LVII.

Television commentary career
In November 2016, Fox News host Greg Gutfeld invited Murdoch to appear as a guest commentator on The Greg Gutfeld Show; after Murdoch's first appearance, Gutfeld offered to have him back on the show – using his stage name "Tyrus" – twice a month. He then began making guest appearances on various programs on Fox News Channel, including The Five. Gutfeld has jokingly referred to Tyrus as his "massive sidekick." Subsequently, he became a regular contributor on Fox News host Dana Perino’s former daytime news show, The Daily Briefing. Since April 2021, Tyrus has been a regular panelist on Gutfeld's relaunched 11 p.m. show, Gutfeld!.

Though a supporter of former President Donald Trump, he did not vote in 2016 and it is unclear whether he did in the subsequent elections.

From 2018 to 2019, he was a co-host of the show Un-PC on Fox News's streaming channel, Fox Nation. In June 2019, he premiered a new Fox Nation show, Nuff Said.

Sexual harassment allegation
In 2019, Un-PC co-host Britt McHenry accused Murdoch of sexual harassment after he allegedly sent her a series of lewd text messages. According to Fox News, the matter was investigated and resolved. However, on December 10, 2019, McHenry filed a sexual harassment suit against Fox News and Murdoch. Subsequently, McHenry claimed that she lost the phone containing text messages she says are central to her claims. In July 2021, she voluntarily dismissed the lawsuit and left the Fox network, apparently as part of a legal settlement.

Filmography

Film

Television

Championships and accomplishments 
National Wrestling Alliance
NWA Worlds Heavyweight Championship (1 time, current)
NWA World Television Championship (1 time)
 Pennsylvania Premiere Wrestling
 PPW Heavyweight Championship (1 time)
 Pro Wrestling Illustrated
 Ranked No. 74 of the top 500 singles wrestlers in the PWI 500 in 2012 and 2013
 Total Nonstop Action Wrestling
 Bound for Gold (2015)
 WWE
 Slammy Award (1 time)
 Best Dancer of the Year (2012)

Book
Just Tyrus: A Memoir (2022), Post Hill Press

References

External links

 
 
 
 
 
 
 Brodus Clay WWE.Com

1973 births
20th-century African-American sportspeople
21st-century African-American sportspeople
21st-century professional wrestlers
American male professional wrestlers
African-American male professional wrestlers
Bodyguards
Fox News people
Living people
Nebraska–Kearney Lopers football players
NWA World Heavyweight Champions
NWA World Television Champions
People from Boston
Professional wrestlers from California
Sportspeople from Pasadena, California